Christopher Stephen Pickles (born 30 January 1966) is an English first-class cricketer, who played for Yorkshire County Cricket Club between 1985 and 1992.

Pickles was born in Mirfield, Yorkshire. In 58 first-class matches, Pickles scored 1,336 runs at 24.29, with a highest score of 66 against Somerset.  He scored seven fifties in all, and took 24 catches.  He took 83 first-class wickets with his right arm medium pace, at 43.83, with a best of 4 for 40 against Northamptonshire, his only first-class four wicket haul.

In 71 one day matches he took 63 wickets at 47.88, with a best analysis of 4 for 36 against Somerset.  He scored 375 runs with a best score of 37 not out against Warwickshire.

He also played for Northamptonshire Under-25s from 1982 to 1983, Yorkshire Under-25s from 1984 to 1987 and for the Yorkshire Second XI from 1984 to 1992.

References

Sources
Cricinfo Profile
Cricket Archive Statistics

1966 births
Living people
English cricketers
Yorkshire cricketers
Sportspeople from Mirfield
Northumberland cricketers
Sportspeople from Yorkshire